Cornelius Hendrik Rogge (21 December 1932 – 17 January 2023) was a Dutch sculptor, installation artist‎ and painter.

Biography

From 1950 to 1952, Rogge attended the Institute for Applied Arts Education (later the Gerrit Rietveld Academie) in Amsterdam. From 1955 to 1957 he studied at the Rijksakademie van beeldende kunsten in Amsterdam. In 1971 he received the American “Cassandra Award” and in 1986 the “David Röell Prize” from the Prins Bernhard Cultuurfonds. Rogge taught at the AKV St. Joost in 's-Hertogenbosch and the Gerrit Rietveld Academy in Amsterdam.

Rogge was a representative of modern art from the post-World War II period. His work is present in multiple Dutch art museums including the Kröller-Müller Museum. In 2005, on the occasion of his 45-years of being an artist, he was appointed Officer in the Order of Orange-Nassau.

Rogge died in Eerbeek on 17 January 2023, at the age of 90.

Expositions
1955: , Arnhem
1965: Twaalf beeldhouwers uit Nederland, Paleis voor Schone Kunsten, Brussels
1970: Stedelijk Museum Amsterdam, Amsterdam
1976: Tentenproject,  (KMM), Otterlo
1984: Institut Néerlandais, Paris
1996: Delphi, Contemporary Arts Center, New Orleans
1999: 40 jaar beelden, Rijksmuseum Twenthe, Enschede
2005: Krijgsgewoel, Legermuseum, Delft
2008: Zieleschepen, Beelden aan Zee, Scheveningen

Gallery

References

1932 births
2023 deaths
Dutch sculptors
People from Amsterdam